Three ships of the United States Navy have been named Bridgeport, after the city of Bridgeport, Connecticut. 

 USS Bridgeport (ID-3009 / AR-2 / AD-10), was originally the German passenger ship SS Breslau, seized during World War I and used as a troopship, then as a repair ship and a destroyer tender.
 USS Bridgeport (CA-127) was to have been an  heavy cruiser but construction was canceled on 12 August 1945.

References

United States Navy ship names